Muhammet Hamza Bakır  is a Turkish Greco-Roman wrestler competing in the 130 kg division of Greco-Roman wrestling. He is a member of the Istanbul BB SK

Career 

Muhammet Hamza Bakır, competing in Greco-Roman wrestling 130 kilograms category, won a bronze medal the 2019 World Junior Wrestling Championships
, which was held in Estonian capital of Tallinn.

Muhammed Hamza Bakır won the gold medal in the Greco-Roman style 130 kg at the 2021 European Juniors Wrestling Championships in Germany. He held on to a 3-1 win against the Ukrainian to defend his European title. In the opening round, Bakir was awarded a point for Vyshnybetskyi's passivity and he performed a gut wrench from the par terre position, leading 3-0 at the break. The Ukrainian also got a point for Bakir's passivity in the second period but he could not take any advantage from the par terre position, giving the Turk the win. Bakir gave up only three points in his four bouts in Dortmund, outscoring his opponents 25-3 on his way to the gold medal.

Muhammed Hamza Bakır won the gold medal in the Greco-Roman style 130 kg at the 2021 World Junior Wrestling Championships in Russia. Competing in the 130 kg category, Bakır defeated Azerbaijani opponent Sarkhan Mammadov by a 3–1 score.

References

External links 
 

Living people
Turkish male sport wrestlers
2001 births
21st-century Turkish people